Solomon Oladele (born 19 May 1990) is a Nigerian football striker.

Career

Early life
Known as Abula during his emergent days, he grew up in the Ikotun area of Lagos in Nigeria, where he played with FC Robo and Young Stars F.C.

Europe 
Solomon began his career with Vejle Football Academy and moved from Nigeria to Denmark in 2008, when he joined Vejle with two other Nigerians, Joseph Akinola Folahan and Chidi Dauda Omeje.  He went on 28 August 2008 to Serbia on trial, later on 2 September signed a profi contract with FK Jagodina. He played his first game for FK Jagodina in the Serbian SuperLiga on 10 December 2008 against FK Javor Ivanjica and scored his first goal. In the 2009-10 season he played on loan with FK Sinđelić Niš in the Serbian League East.

Swaziland 
By September 2013 he was in the highlights while being a prolific goalscorer when playing with the Green Mamba F.C. in Swaziland Premier League.

In June 2015, after an excellent season with Red Lions in the Swazi Premier League, he was declared best striker in the league by The Swazi Observer.

References

External sources
 Solomon Oladele at Srbijafudbal.

Living people
1988 births
Sportspeople from Lagos
Nigerian footballers
Nigerian expatriate footballers
FK Sinđelić Niš players
FK Jagodina players
Serbian SuperLiga players
Expatriate footballers in Serbia
Association football forwards
Yoruba sportspeople
Expatriate footballers in Eswatini
Green Mamba F.C. players
Nigerian expatriate sportspeople in Serbia
Nigerian expatriate sportspeople in Eswatini